Ümmügülsüm Bedel (born 8 February 1995) is a Turkish handballer, who plays in the Turkish Women's Handball Super League for İzmir BSB, the Turkey national handball team, and the Turkey national beach handball team.
She plays in the left wing position.

Bedel played for Turkey's national team at the 2017 Islamic Solidarity Games in Baku, Azerbaijan, which became the runner-up.

References

External links
Ümmügülsüm Bedel @Turkey Handball Federation website 

1995 births
Living people
Sportspeople from Muğla
Turkey women's national handball players
Turkish beach handball players
İzmir Büyükşehir Belediyespor handball players
21st-century Turkish women